The MV Sealth is a  operated by Washington State Ferries. She is named for Chief Sealth. The Sealth underwent cabin rebuilding in last 2006, after which she was in service on the Fauntleroy-Vashon-Southworth route. The Sealth was then the #2 vessel on the route. Earlier she was taken out of service due to a seam needing weld repairs.

 The Sealth was not listed to return to the San Juan Islands in late 2015. She was in service at Seattle/Bremerton and switched to the Vashon route mid-fall and she remained there until the Winter 2016 schedule began. Defiance-Tahlequah route. She is currently on the Fauntleroy-Vashon-Southworth route, generally operating the #2 sailing position.

Incidents
On November 7, 2012, the Sealth was serving the Bremerton run when a hole four feet under the waterline at No. 2 end port side was discovered. The ferry was pulled from service in the day and the leak was fixed a week later at Dakota Creek Shipyard of Anacortes.

No major damage was reported.

References

Washington State Ferries vessels
1982 ships